Megachile semicircularis is a species of bee in the family Megachilidae. It was described by van der Zanden in 1996.

References

Semicircularis
Insects described in 1996